This is a list of the extreme points of North Macedonia: the points that are farther north, south, east or west than any other location, as well as the highest and lowest points.

Latitude and longitude

Altitude 
 Maximum: Golem Korab (2764 m)
 Minimum: Vardar River (50 m)

Other features 

 Southernmost settlement: Dragoš, Bitola Municipality / Dolno Dupeni, Resen Municipality
 Northernmost settlement: Luke,  Kriva Palanka Municipality
 Easternmost settlement: Spikovo, Pehčevo Municipality
 Westernmost settlement: Konjari, Debar Municipality

See also 
 Extreme points of Europe
 Extreme points of Earth

References

Lists of coordinates
North Macedonia
Extreme